Phebe Fairchild: Her Book is a children's historical novel by Lois Lenski. It describes life in rural Connecticut in the 1830s. The novel, illustrated by the author, was first published in 1936 and was a Newbery Honor recipient in 1937.

To be reissued in 2020 by Purple House Press.

References

1936 American novels
Children's historical novels
American children's novels
Newbery Honor-winning works
Novels set in Connecticut
Novels set in the 1830s
1936 children's books